John & Florence McKeage House is a national historic site located at 209 Park Street South, St. Petersburg, Florida in Pinellas County. It is an Art Moderne style house constructed in 1938.

It was added to the National Register of Historic Places on April 9, 2013.

References

National Register of Historic Places in Pinellas County, Florida
Houses in St. Petersburg, Florida
Houses completed in 1938
1938 establishments in Florida